= RF Engines =

RF Engines Limited of Newport, Isle of Wight, UK was founded in 1999. RF Engines (RFEL) develops products based on high performance, digital signal processing techniques that enable fast moving events or fleeting, hopping signals occurring in the radio spectrum to be identified and acquired in real-time for subsequent analysis.

RFEL's products have a variety of applications, including in the design of efficient wireless communication (satellite and terrestrial) networks, test and measurement instrumentation, homeland security surveillance systems, bespoke wideband receivers/transceivers and in systems to detect signals from fast moving missiles or other military threats.

RFEL's customers are mainly 'Tier 1' companies in each of its main markets, including Thales, Qinetiq, Max Planck Institute for Radioastronomy (Germany), UK Ministry of Defence, Rheinmetall (Germany), CEA (France), Agilent (Switzerland) and LIG Nex1(Korea),

As of 2009 RFEL was bought by Rheinmetall and renamed to Rheinmetall Electronics UK (REUK).

In 2026, REUK was a key part of the bid by the OMNIA Training consortium (Lead by Raytheon UK and also containing Capita, Cervus and Skyral) which was awarded the British Army’s Collective Training System (ACTS) contract to run military collective training for the next 15 years.

== Academic links ==
RFEL is sponsoring students focusing on MSc degrees at the University of York with two special awards of £1,500 each that will be presented to graduates of the DSP course: one for 'excellence in theoretical signal processing' and secondly for 'excellence in signal processing design'.

== Awards ==
- Smart award in 2002
- Start up of the Year in 2004 European Electronics Industry Award
- Embedded System Innovation of the Year in 2006 Elektra European Electronic Awards
- South East Business Award 2008 for Innovation and Creativity
- Queen's Award for Innovation 2009
